Darya Khan is a town in Dera Ghazi Khan District, Punjab, Pakistan.  It lies on the east bank of the Indus River.

Its elevation is 165m.

See also 

 Railway stations in Pakistan

References 

Populated places in Dera Ghazi Khan District